Wamba is a genus of comb-footed spiders that was first described by Octavius Pickard-Cambridge in 1896.  it contains three species, found in the Americas, including the Caribbean: W. congener, W. crispulus, and W. panamensis.

See also
 List of Theridiidae species

References

Araneomorphae genera
Taxa named by Octavius Pickard-Cambridge
Theridiidae